Prior to the beginning of the 2007–08 season, Bayern Munich underwent a major restructuring of the team, releasing or retiring nine players while adding ten others to the squad, most notably Luca Toni and Franck Ribéry. The season started with Bayern winning the DFB-Ligapokal, followed by a shootout win in the DFB-Pokal against Wacker Burghausen on 6 August 2007. On the first day of the 2007–08 Bundesliga season, Bayern achieved a 3–0 victory over Hansa Rostock. As the season progressed, Bayern continued in first in the league table, eventually winning the championship. Bayern also won the 2007–08 DFB-Pokal, thereby completing the domestic treble. International success was thwarted by Zenit Saint Petersburg, however, when Bayern suffered a horrible 4–0 defeat in the second leg of the semi-final after a draw at home. The match was later alleged to have been fixed. The 2007–08 season was goalkeeper Oliver Kahn's last season with Bayern.

Bundesliga

League table

Matches

DFB-Pokal

1st round

2nd round

3rd round

Quarterfinal

Semifinal

Final

UEFA Cup

1st round

Group stage

Round of 32

Round of 16

Quarterfinal

Semifinal

Friendly

Individual statistics

|-
|colspan="14"|Players sold or loaned out during the summer transfer market:

|}

Transfers

In

Out

References

Roster
Schedule
Statistics

FC Bayern Munich seasons
Bayern Munich
German football championship-winning seasons